Riccardo Tosi (born 27 December 1999) is an Italian footballer who plays as a goalkeeper for  club Mantova.

Club career

Verona
He joined the Under-19 squad of Verona in 2016. For the 2017–18 season he was loaned to Serie D club Virtus Verona.

Loan to Arzignano
For the 2018–19 season he joined Serie D club Arzignano on loan. He established himself as the first-choice goalkeeper for the team and helped it achieve promotion to Serie C. On 12 July 2019 the loan was renewed for the 2019–20 season.

He made his professional Serie C debut for Arzignano on 25 August 2019 in a season-opening game against Piacenza.

Mantova
On 19 August 2020 he joined Mantova.

References

External links
 
 

1999 births
Living people
Sportspeople from the Province of Verona
Footballers from Veneto
Italian footballers
Association football goalkeepers
Serie C players
Serie D players
Hellas Verona F.C. players
Virtus Verona players
F.C. Arzignano Valchiampo players
Mantova 1911 players